Roma pizza may refer to:
 Roman pizza
 Italian tomato pie, specifically that sold by Roma Pizza in Hamilton, Ontario

See also
 Roman's Pizza